General Shamim Alam Khan  (18 August 1937 – 9 December 2021), was a Pakistan Army senior general, who served as the 7th Chairman Joint Chiefs of Staff Committee from 1991 until retiring in 1994.

Biography

Shamim Alam Khan was born in Shillong, Meghalaya in India, into an Urdu-speaking family on 18 August 1937. His father, Mahboob Alam Khan, was an officer in the Indian Civil Service who worked at an administration position at the Survey of India. His mother, Nisa Begum, was a housewife. Mahboob had nine children with Nisa among all joined the respected branches of the Pakistan Armed Forces.

After the partition of India in 1947, the Alam family moved from Bangalore to Rawalpindi via train, witnessing the violence and riots that were taking place in the trains at the time of the partition in 1947. Eventually, Mahboob Alam found employment at the Survey of Pakistan.

After his matriculation, Alam went to attend the Lawrence College where he earned the diploma, which allowed to him to attend the Government College University (GCU) in Lahore, Punjab, Pakistan. However, he left his studies at the GCU after he joined the Pakistan Army in 1954 which directed him to attend the Pakistan Military Academy in Kakul. In 1956, he passed out in the class of 14th PMA Long Course from the PMA Kakul, earning a commission in the 20th Lancers, Armoured Corps. In 1958–60, Lt. Alam joined the elite Special Service Group (SSG), eventually was selected to be trained with the United States Army's Special Forces in Fort Bragg in North Carolina, United States.

Upon returning, Major Alam participated in the second war with India in 1965, commanding a company against the Indian Army and his actions of valour earned him the Sitara-e-Jurat by the President of Pakistan in 1966. In 1967–70, Maj. Alam went to the United Kingdom where he attended the British Army's Staff College in Camberley, and served in the 28th Cavalry in the Chamb sector on the western front of the third war with India in 1971. After the war, Maj. Alam went to attend the National Defence University, along with his brother Lt-Cdr. Shamoon, as both graduated with MSc in War studies. For sometime, Lt-Col. Shamim served a brief stint as an instructor at the Air War College in Islamabad.

War and command appointments in the military

In 1979–80s, Brig. Shamim served as the Chief of Staff in the I Corps, stationed in Mangla, before commanding the independent armoured brigade stationed in Balochistan. From 1983 to 1985, Major-General Shamim was given the command as GOC of the 1st Armoured Division in Multan.

In 1987 and 1988, Maj-Gen. Shamim's promotion was eventually deferred and overlooked by then-army chief and President Zia-ul-Haq when he only promoted the officer to the command assignment of his choosing. However, Prime Minister Mohammad Junejo interfered in this matter, and eventually he was promoted to the command assignment with the officer of Zia's choosing.

In 1988, Lt-Gen. Shamim was posted on his first formation commanding assignment as the field command of the II Strike Corps, stationed in Multan, Punjab, Pakistan, which he served until 1989 when he was elevated as the Chief of General Staff (CGS) at the Army GHQ in Rawalpindi. In April 1991, Lt-Gen. Shamim was made the field commander of the XXXI Corps, stationed in Bahawalpur, but this command assignment only lasted a few months when President Ghulam Ishaq Khan announced the promotion of the Lt-Gen. Shamim to the four-star rank– he superseded no one as he was the most senior army general in the military.

Chairman joint chiefs

On 8 November 1991, Gen. Shamim took over the Chairmanship of the Joint Chiefs of Staff Committee, and later went on to play a decisive role in support of Gen. Abdul Waheed, then-chief of army staff, to secure the resignations of both President Ghulam Ishaq and Prime Minister Nawaz Sharif to oversee the nationwide general elections in 1993. On 26 November 1992, Gen. Shamim was appointed to the ceremonial post as Col-in-C of the Armoured Corps, which he remained until 18 December 1996. In 1994, Gen. Shamim sought his retirement after completing his tenureship in 1994.

Death
Khan died from COVID-19 in Rawalpindi on 9 December 2021, aged 84, amid the COVID-19 pandemic in Pakistan.

Awards and decorations

Foreign Decorations

Gallery

References

External links
"Brig Z.A. Khan interview to Defence Journal"

|-

1937 births
2021 deaths
People from Shillong
Military personnel from Bangalore
Muhajir people
People from Rawalpindi
Lawrence College Ghora Gali alumni
Government College University, Lahore alumni
Pakistan Military Academy alumni
Pakistan Armoured Corps officers
Special Services Group officers
Graduates of the Staff College, Camberley
Pakistani military personnel of the Indo-Pakistani War of 1971
National Defence University, Pakistan alumni
Pakistani generals
Chairmen Joint Chiefs of Staff Committee
Recipients of Nishan-e-Imtiaz
Recipients of Sitara-e-Jurat
Deaths from the COVID-19 pandemic in Punjab, Pakistan